Ernest Wilson Huffcut (November 21, 1860May 4, 1907)  was an American lawyer and educator, born in Kent, Connecticut.  He attended Cornell University, where he was a brother of Theta Delta Chi and subsequently graduated in 1884. Following his undergraduate education, he enrolled directly into the Cornell Law School from which he graduated in 1888. He then practiced law at Minneapolis, Minnesota, in 1888–90, served as professor of law at Indiana University in 1890–92, and thereafter was dean of Cornell Law School.  Governor Charles Evans Hughes, of New York, at the beginning of his first term (1907), appointed Huffcut his legal adviser. Supposedly the result of a breakdown due to overwork,  Huffcut committed suicide by shooting himself on board the Albany boat, C. W. Morse coming down the Hudson River.

Published works
 American Cases on Contracts (1884; third revised edition, 1913)  with E. H. Woodruff
 Cases on the Law of Agency (1896; second edition, 1907)  
 Elements of Business Law (1905)

References

External links
 

1860 births
1907 suicides
People from Kent, Connecticut
American legal scholars
American legal writers
Cornell Law School alumni
Cornell University faculty
Minnesota lawyers
Suicides by firearm in New York (state)